Frank Edward Stubbs  (12 March 1888 – 25 April 1915) was an English recipient of the Victoria Cross, the highest and most prestigious award for gallantry in the face of the enemy that can be awarded to British and Commonwealth forces.

Stubbs was 27 years old, and a sergeant in the 1st Battalion, Lancashire Fusiliers, British Army during the First World War. He was killed in action on 25 April 1915 while landing on W Beach in Cape Helles, Gallipoli, Turkey.

Stubbs was one of the six members of the regiment elected for the award by the survivors.  These were hailed in the press as 'six VC's before breakfast', and the commander of the Allied troops at Gallipoli, General Ian Hamilton ordered that the beach be renamed 'Lancashire Landing'.

The other five of the '6 VCs before breakfast' were awarded to Cuthbert Bromley, John Elisha Grimshaw, William Kenealy, Alfred Joseph Richards and Richard Raymond Willis.

Citation

He is commemorated on the Helles Memorial. His Victoria Cross is displayed at the Fusilier Museum in Bury, Lancashire.

References 

 Monuments to Courage (David Harvey, 1999)
 The Register of the Victoria Cross (This England, 1997)
 VCs of the First World War - Gallipoli (Stephen Snelling, 1995)

1888 births
1915 deaths
British Gallipoli campaign recipients of the Victoria Cross
Lancashire Fusiliers soldiers
British Army personnel of World War I
British military personnel killed in World War I
People from Walworth
British Army recipients of the Victoria Cross
Military personnel from Surrey